A Patriot's History of the United States: From Columbus's Great Discovery to the War on Terror is a 2004 book on American history by Larry Schweikart and Michael Allen. Written from a conservative standpoint, it is a counterpoint to Howard Zinn's A People's History of the United States and asserts that the United States is an "overwhelmingly positive" force for good in the world. Schweikart said that he wrote it with Allen because he could not find an American history textbook without "leftist bias".

Reception
Larry Schweikart recounted to Steven K. Bannon that the book had respectable sales for several years after publication, but rocketed up the best seller charts after being recommended by talk-show host Glenn Beck, hitting #1 on the New York Times and Amazon.com bestseller lists.

In a review in the conservative magazine National Review, Matthew Spalding of the Heritage Foundation wrote that "A Patriot's History rejects the economic determinism of  Beard and Zinn, and others who 'wrongly assume that people were (and are) incapable of acting outside of self-interest.'" Spalding continued:

Reviewing the book in the journal The History Teacher, David Hoogland Noon was critical of it. According to Noon, the book's peculiar priorities – it "devotes a single paragraph to the Japanese internment while squandering an entire page with denunciations of liberal historians and their treatments of the subject" – as well as the omission of landmark works from its sources, suggest "ignorance of the basic parameters of actual historical scholarship". Moreover, according to Noon, "the authors make claims that are not even remotely endorsed by the footnoted sources". "Written for an audience of the previously converted," Noon concluded, "this book is hardly worth anyone else's time."

Writing in the Claremont Review of Books, David J. Bobb praised the book as a fine teaching tool, stating that every page of the book is "full of statements that would make Zinn snarl" and that it  "gives students an example of honest historical inquiry.  

Criticizing the book from a conservative perspective, Paul Gottfried in The American Conservative characterized A Patriot's History as an example of neoconservative historiography:

In his review of the book in The Wall Street Journal, Brendan Miniter called a Patriot's History a "fluent account of America from the discovery of the Continent up to the present day", and wrote that the book serves to "remind us what a few good individuals can do in just a few short centuries."

John Coleman reviewing the book in the Institute for Humane Studies, praised it as "thorough and easy to read" and stated:

References

External links
 The book's website

2004 non-fiction books
Books about foreign relations of the United States
Books about politics of the United States
Books about economic history
History books about the United States
Conservative media in the United States
Collaborative non-fiction books
Sentinel (publisher) books